Aquilo may refer to:

 Aquilo (band), English musical duo
 Aquilo (god), Roman name for Boreas, one of the Greek Anemoi or wind gods
 Aquilo (steamboat), steamboat which operated on Lake Washington and Puget Sound 
 Aquilo (steam yacht), private yacht built 1901 for William Phelps Eno

See also
 Aquilopolis